Clackers were 1970s toys.

Clackers may also refer to:

 A term for editorial staff at the fictional fashion magazine in the novel The Devil Wears Prada
 A term for computer operators in the novel The Difference Engine
 Clackers cereal, a type of cereal made by General Mills
 Clapperboard, a device used in film production that "clacks" when identifying scene and take information
 A slang term for testicles

See also
 Clack (disambiguation), for persons named Clack
 Clacker (disambiguation)
 Onomatopoeia